Dogdyke railway station was a station on the former Great Northern Railway between Boston and Lincoln.

The station, and essentially the hamlet of Dogdyke itself, served a transhipment point at the confluence of the rivers Bain and Witham.  Principal traffic was agricultural, but also included coals for the nearby Drainage engine whose fuel had always been delivered by water.  Before the railway there had been traffic from the Bain and the Horncastle Canal

It served the village of Dogdyke in Lincolnshire, England until closure in 1963. The station was immortalised in 1964 in the song "Slow Train" by Flanders and Swann.

See also
 Dogdyke Engine

References

External links
 Disused stations
 Belle Isle Marina on the site of the station

Disused railway stations in Lincolnshire
Former Great Northern Railway stations
Railway stations in Great Britain opened in 1849
Railway stations in Great Britain closed in 1963
1849 establishments in England